Mohamed Hassan (born 13 February 1972) is an Egyptian swimmer. He competed in two events at the 1988 Summer Olympics.

References

1972 births
Living people
Egyptian male swimmers
Olympic swimmers of Egypt
Swimmers at the 1988 Summer Olympics
Place of birth missing (living people)